The QBU-10 or Type 10 sniper rifle is a semi-automatic anti-materiel rifle designed and manufactured by Norinco. First introduced in 2010, it has since seen use by the People's Liberation Army Ground Force, People's Liberation Army Navy, and Marine Corps.

Overview 
QBU-10 is a type of semi-automatic anti-materiel rifle adopted by the Chinese military to roughly match the capability provided by Barrett M82 for United States military forces. The QBU10 features a gas operated, rotating bolt mechanics with a recoiling barrel. The rifle is reported to have a slightly better accuracy than Barrett M82. The rifle is fed through a 5-round detachable box magazine. Recoil is mitigated through a muzzle brake and rubber recoil pad, and a rear monopod can provide stable firing platform. The rifle can be disassembled into several major components, including barrel, receiver, shoulder stock, and the grip with trigger unit.

Each QBU-10 is fitted with a YMA09 telescopic sighting unit (8x) with integrated ballistic computer and laser range finder. An additional night-time IR unit can be attached to the scope to provide thermal capability. The sighting unit is waterproofed with a range finder button extended to the trigger guard. YMA09 scope was superseded by the QMH151A integrated daylight/thermal scope with datalink and fire control system. QBU-10 can also mount CS/ON2A night vision scope.

Two type of dedicated sniper ammunitions are developed for the QBU-10. DBT-10 12.7×108mm sniper cartridge features air-resistance reduction design. The DBJ-10 12.7×108mm multipurpose round is a type of armor-piercing incendiary PELE ammunition. The ammo utilizes "penetrator with enhanced lateral effect" (PELE), which contains inert substance inside the cartridge instead of incendiary explosives, and the inert substance will trigger a pressurized shockwave, sending off shrapnel after the round penetrating through armor.

Users 
: People's Armed Police, People's Liberation Army Ground Force, People's Liberation Army Navy Marine Corps.

See also 
QBU-201
Zijiang M99
Accuracy International AS50
Barrett M82/M107
OSV-96

References

12.7×108 mm sniper rifles
Semi-automatic rifles
Sniper rifles of the People's Republic of China
Anti-materiel rifles